Fred James Hatfield (March 18, 1925 – May 22, 1998), nicknamed "Scrap Iron", was a Major League Baseball infielder who played nine seasons in the Major Leagues with the Boston Red Sox (1950–52), Detroit Tigers (1952–56), Chicago White Sox (1956–57), Cleveland Indians (1958) and Cincinnati Redlegs (1958).

Playing career
Born in Lanett, Alabama, Hatfield attended Birmingham–Southern College and Troy State College before Hatfield was signed by the Red Sox as an amateur free agent in 1942. As a big-leaguer, Hatfield played in 722 games and had a career batting average of .242 with an on-base percentage of .332.  He had 493 hits, 248 bases on balls, and 165 RBIs.

Hatfield played in the infield, with 408 games at third base, 179 games at second base, and 27 games at shortstop.

Hatfield was among the American League leaders in being hit by pitch in 1952, 1954, 1956, and 1957.  He was also among the league leaders in 1955 for sacrifice hits and intentional walks.

Coaching career
As his playing career wound down in the minor leagues in the late 1950s, Hatfield became a professional baseball manager and coach, and a college baseball coach. He skippered teams in the minors for 16 years between 1960 and 1986, spent two seasons (1977–78) as the third-base coach on Ralph Houk's Detroit Tigers staff, and five years (1964–68) as head baseball coach of the Florida State Seminoles, where he posted a 161–57 (.739) record. He was posthumously inducted into the Florida State University Hall of Fame in 1999.

Hatfield died in 1998 at age 73 in Tallahassee, Florida.

References

External links
, or Retrosheet, or SABR Biography Project, or DeadBall Era Obituary

1925 births
1998 deaths
Asheville Tourists managers
Baseball players from Alabama
Birmingham Barons players
Boston Red Sox players
California Angels scouts
Canton Terriers players
Chicago White Sox players
Cincinnati Redlegs players
Cleveland Indians players
Danville-Schoolfield Leafs players
Denver Bears players
Detroit Tigers coaches
Detroit Tigers players
Florida State Seminoles baseball coaches
Jamestown Tigers players
Lakeland Flying Tigers managers
Little Rock Travelers players
Louisville Colonels (minor league) players
Lynn Red Sox players
Major League Baseball second basemen
Major League Baseball third base coaches
Major League Baseball third basemen
Modesto Colts players
New York Yankees scouts
Oakland Athletics scouts
People from Lanett, Alabama
Roanoke Red Sox players
San Diego Padres (minor league) players
Scranton Red Sox players
Spokane Indians players
Troy Trojans baseball players
American expatriate baseball people in the Dominican Republic